Cepora celebensis is a butterfly in the family Pieridae. It is found on Sulawesi.

Subspecies
The following subspecies are recognised:
Cepora celebensis celebensis
Cepora celebensis kazuyoe Watanabe, 1987 (south-eastern Sulawesi)

References

Pierini
Butterflies described in 1892
Butterflies of Indonesia